Switchback may refer to:

Transportation
 A hairpin turn on a road
 A horseshoe curve
 A zigzagging pedestrian or cycling ramp
 A roller coaster, or a roller coaster-like road
 A zig zag (railway)
 The Switchback, a former railway line in Glasgow, Scotland
 A motorcycle having detachable windscreens and luggage bags, e.g. Harley-Davidson's Dyna 2012 model

Entertainment
Switchback Railway, the first roller coaster designed as an amusement ride in the United States
Switchback (rollercoaster), a wooden roller coaster located at ZDT's Amusement Park
Switchback (band), a duo which plays Americana music
Switchback (TV series), a Canadian television show for children and teens broadcast on the CBC in the 1980s
Switchback (comics), a Marvel Comics character connected to the X-Men
Switchback (film), a 1997 film starring Dennis Quaid and Danny Glover
"Switchback" (Celldweller song), a song from Celldweller's album Celldweller
"Switchback" (Music for Pleasure song), a song from Music for Pleasure's album Into the Rain

Other uses 
Switchback, West Virginia, an unincorporated community in the United States
 In asymptotic analysis (mathematics), a term of intermediate order multiplying a homogenous solution (forced by matching to an outer solution)
 Magnetic switchback, a sudden reversal in the magnetic field of the solar wind observed on the Sun